Gibbula tingitana is a species of sea snail, a marine gastropod mollusk in the family Trochidae, the top snails.

Description
The size of the shell varies between 2 mm and 5 mm.

Distribution
This species occurs in the Western Mediterranean Sea and off Morocco (Tangiers).

References

External links
 
 Pallary P. (1901). Diagnoses de quelques coquilles nouvelles provenant du Maroc. Journal de Conchyliologie 49: 226–228, 314-315 page(s): 315
 Pallary, P., 1920 - Exploration scientifique du Maroc organisée par la Société de Géographie de Paris et continuée par la Société des Sciences Naturelles du Maroc. Deuxième fascicule. Malacologie (1912)., vol. (2)("1912"), p. 1-108
 Gofas, S.; Le Renard, J.; Bouchet, P. (2001). Mollusca. in: Costello, M.J. et al. (eds), European Register of Marine Species: a check-list of the marine species in Europe and a bibliography of guides to their identification. Patrimoines Naturels. 50: 180-213.

tingitana
Gastropods described in 1902